Cyclopoma (from  , 'circular' and   'cover') is an extinct genus of perch-like fishes belonging to the family Serranidae.

Fossil record
Fossils of Cyclopoma  are found in the Eocene of Virginia and Monte Bolca (age range: from 55.8 to 50.3 million years ago.).

Species
 Cyclopoma folmeri Weems 1999
 Cyclopoma gigas Agassiz 1833
 Cyclopoma spinosum Agassiz 1833

See also

 List of prehistoric bony fish genera
 Prehistoric fish

References

Serranidae
Taxa named by Louis Agassiz